Louis-Henri de Brancas-Forcalquier, (Pernes-les-Fontaines, 19 January 1672 – 9 August 1750) was a Marshal of France.

He was the second marquis of Céreste, but was better known as Le Marquis de Brancas. He was also (nominal) prince souverain of the island of Nisyros. This principality had been created for Bufille Brancaccio, count of Agnano, Sicily, by Pope Boniface IX.

He served Louis XV of France on land and sea and was made a Marshal of France in 1740.

Louis-Henri de Brancas-Forcalquier was also French ambassador in Spain, Grandee of Spain and a Knight of the Order of the Golden Fleece.

He married on 24 January 1696 Elizabeth Charlotte de Brancas-Villars.

Sources

1672 births
1750 deaths
French marquesses
Grandees of Spain
Knights of the Golden Fleece of Spain
Marshals of France